Birkenhead Central is a railway station serving the town of Birkenhead, in Merseyside, England. Located on the south side of Birkenhead town centre, it lies on the Chester and Ellesmere Port branches of the Wirral Line, part of the Merseyrail network.

History 
Birkenhead Central station was opened in 1886 as part of the Mersey Railway's route from Liverpool, via the Mersey Railway Tunnel under the River Mersey.  The station was the location of the Mersey Railway's headquarters. The disused building of Birkenhead Central depot, which closed in the 1990s, remains adjacent to the platforms. The station platforms were refurbished and finished in 2012.

Facilities
The station is staffed, during all opening hours, and has platform CCTV. There are toilets, several payphones, a vending machine, booking office and live departure and arrival screens, on the platform, for passenger information. Each platform has a waiting shelter, as well as sheltered seating. The station does not have a car park, but does have a secure cycle locker with 28 spaces. Access to the station is by ramp, and there is step-free access to the platforms, for wheelchairs and prams, via the lifts. The station also has a snack bar, in the main booking hall.

Services 
Trains operate every 15 minutes between Chester and Liverpool on weekdays and Saturdays until late evening when the service becomes half-hourly, as it is on Sundays. Additionally there is a half-hourly service between Liverpool and Ellesmere Port all day, every day. Northbound trains operate via Hamilton Square station in Birkenhead and the Mersey Railway Tunnel to Liverpool.  Southbound trains all proceed as far as Hooton, where the lines to Chester and Ellesmere Port divide. These services are all provided by Merseyrail's fleet of Class 507 and Class 508 EMUs.

Gallery

See also
 List of underground stations of the Merseyrail network

References

Further reading

External links 

Railway stations in the Metropolitan Borough of Wirral
DfT Category E stations
Former Mersey Railway stations
Railway stations in Great Britain opened in 1886
Railway stations served by Merseyrail